The Farewell is a 2000 German drama film directed by Jan Schütte. It was screened in the Un Certain Regard section at the 2000 Cannes Film Festival.

Cast
 Josef Bierbichler - Bertolt Brecht
 Monica Bleibtreu - Helene Weigel
 Jeanette Hain - Käthe Reichel
 Elfriede Irrall - Elisabeth Hauptmann
 Margit Rogall - Ruth Berlau
 Samuel Finzi - Wolfgang Harich
 Rena Zednikova - Isot Kilian
 Birgit Minichmayr - Barbara Brecht
 Tilman Günther - Offizier der Staatssicherheit
 Paul Herwig - Manfred Wekwerth
 Claudius Freyer - Peter Palitzsch
 Emanuel Spitzy - Jungpionier
 Slawomir Holland - Offizier der Staatssicherheit
 Piotr Kryska - Fahrer der Staatssicherheit

References

External links

2000 films
2000 biographical drama films
2000s German-language films
German biographical drama films
Films directed by Jan Schütte
Biographical films about writers
Films set in 1956
Films set in East Germany
Films scored by John Cale
Bertolt Brecht
Biographical films about dramatists and playwrights
2000s German films